Timothy Schmalz (born in 1969) is a Canadian sculptor based out of St. Jacobs, Ontario, Canada. He focuses on religious figures and also has many public pieces. Schmalz is best known for his Homeless Jesus that he created in reaction to the many homeless living on the streets. Schmalz conceives his sculptures with keen devotion to Catholicism and gives his time to each piece, sometimes taking as much as 10 years forming the idea and sculpting it. Some of his works are created in series and others are single pieces. Schmalz has said, "If my sculptures are used by people as a tool to think, then I’m very happy." Installments of his work have brought his visual message across the globe with Homeless Jesus having been displayed in many places including St. Peter's Basilica.

Work 
Although best known for his Homeless Jesus, Schmalz has also created many other pieces. The statue, Golden Leaves, features young Lightfoot playing guitar surrounded by a ring of maple leaves. The leaves each contain an image inspired by one song. Schmalz plans to sculpt each leaf and place them along the Lightfoot Trail in Orillia and make duplicates that will be placed at locations fitting for each song. A leaf inspired by the song Black Day in July was revealed in Tudhope Park on July 10, 2016, as the second installment in the Gordon Lightfoot Sculpture Park.

Schmalz also created the Canadian Veterans Memorial. Schmalz worked every Canadian Armed Forces uniform into this piece that stretches towards the sky using perspective. He also networked through the local paper asking for families to send in images of family or friends who had served in the war.

Schmalz  recently completed sculpting 100 cantos of Dante's Divine Comedy to celebrate Dante's 700 anniversary.

See also
Angels Unawares

References

Canadian male sculptors
Artists from Ontario
Living people
1969 births
People from the Regional Municipality of Waterloo